Theekuchi is a 2008 Indian Tamil-language action film directed by A. L. Raja. The film stars Jai Varma and newcomer Mythri, while Vadivelu, Bhanupriya, Ashish Vidyarthi, and Dhandapani play supporting roles. The music was composed by Srikanth Deva. The film was released on 14 March 2008. The film was dubbed into Telugu language as Aggiravva with additional scenes featuring Vinutha Lal and Brahmanandam, and it was released in 2014.

Plot
Sakthi (Jai Varma) is on a mission to take revenge on those who usurped government land and killed his mother (Bhanupriya), who wanted to construct a school there. Instead, a local illicit arrack seller and rowdy named Pasupathy Pandian (Ashish Vidyarthi), with the help of the Education Minister (Dhandapani), builds a self-financing private engineering college and strikes gold. Pasupathy becomes rich and powerful by giving admissions by getting capitation fees. The poor students who do not pay up either commit suicide or disappear. Sakthi and his friends, including the heroine (Mythriya), Pasupathy's daughter, fight back against the injustice and nefarious activities going on in the campus. How they ultimately triumph and justice prevails is what the movie is about.

Cast

Jai Varma as Sakthi
Menakai
Vadivelu as Kuravan
Bhanupriya as Sakthi's mother
Ashish Vidyarthi as Pasupathy Pandian
Dhandapani as Education Minister
Thambi Ramaiah as Kurangu Ramasamy
Cochin Haneefa as Kasi
Pandi as Kuravan's son
Poovilangu Mohan
Rajeev
Manivannan
Balu Anand
Suman Setty
Vinu Chakravarthy
S. S. Rajendran
Vasu Vikram
Shobha
Kalidas
S. Rajasekar
Singamuthu
Mahanadhi Shankar
Vaiyapuri
Crane Manohar
Karate Raja
Benjamin

Production
Theekuchi is produced by G. A. Lucas for Star Movie Makers. A. L. Rajan, who earlier directed Parthiban starrer Ninaikkatha Naalillai, was selected as director. Jai Varma, brother of Disco Shanti and who earlier appeared in Azhagiya Theeye, was selected to play the lead role. It was also the last film for S. S. Rajendran as an actor, before his death in 2014.

The film was launched in 2005 and the shooting was commenced at locations in Madurai, Tirupparakundram, Kodaikanal, Nagercoil, and Kanyakumari among other places. The film faced controversy when actresses from Kerala complained that producer did not pay salary for them. The filming was finished in 2006 and was finalised to release in 2007 but failed to meet deadline and it had a low key release in 2008.

Soundtrack
The music was composed by Srikanth Deva, while lyrics were written by P. Vijay, Snehan, Nandalala, Vijay Sagar, and Jayaravi.

References

External links 

2008 action films
Indian action films
2008 films
2000s Tamil-language films
Films scored by Srikanth Deva